Cape Shelagsky or Cape Shelag, also known as Erri by the Siberian Yupik, is a headland situated in eastern Siberia, Russia on the shores of the East Siberian Sea.  

The cape was named after the Shelags, a little-known ethnic group that lived on the Arctic coast to the east of Cape Shelagsky.

Geography
It is the eastern headland at the entrance of Chaun Bay. The cape is located at the western end of the Shelag Range, the northwesternmost subrange of the Chukotka Mountains.

References

Bays of Chukotka Autonomous Okrug
Bays of the East Siberian Sea